Goffar known as Goffar the Pict, was a pseudo-historical king of Aquitaine around the year  in Geoffrey of Monmouth's Historia Regum Britanniae. In the story, he was defeated by Brutus of Troy and Corineus on their way to Britain. Later histories of Britain and France included Goffar from Historia Regum Britanniae, and sometimes expanded the story with some additional details.

Historia Regum Britanniae 

In the myths surrounding Brutus of Troy's occupation of Britain, Goffar led the Poitevins to war against Brutus' fleet. Although he sent messengers under a certain Himbert first, they got in a fight with Corineus, Brutus' general, over royal property and all of the messengers were brutally killed.

After a battle at the mouth of the Loire, the Trojans marched up the Loire through Goffar's dominions until they reached the territory of the Turones. There a battle was fought against troops given to Goffar by the eleven other kings of Gaul, and won, founding the city of Tours named in honor of Brutus' nephew Turnus, who died fighting.

This idea probably comes from Nennius' confusing passage in his Historia Brittonum: "he was exiled on account of the death of Turnus, slain by Eneas. He then went among the Gauls and built a city of the Turones, called Turnis [Tours]". Nennius is correct that the city is named after the tribe, not the similarly named person.

Rowland Wymer points out the brutality in this account of Brutus' killing of Goffar's people.

The first battle, including Goffar, is vividly portrayed in a  tapestry now held in the Cathedral of the Savior of Zaragoza's museum.

British tradition 
Wace's Roman de Brut (1155) expands on Monmouth's Historia Regum Britanniae, and includes Goffar (also variously spelled Gofar, Gossac, and Gofiers) as the king of Poitiers. Medievalist Antoine Le Roux de Lincy believed that Wace intended Goffar to be the fifth century king of Burgundy Gunther.

Layamon's Brut has Goffar (Goffare in the Otho manuscript version) as the king of Poitou, and gives the name of his messenger as Goffar's steward Numbert the alderman ("Numberd the man" in Otho). It follows the story of Historia Regum Britanniae and Roman de Brut, but has Corineus deny the righteousness of the king's frith (both "peace" and law) which emerges as a form of subjegation instead of protection, and also recasts the killing of Numbert in terms of personal honour and retribution.

Peter Langtoft's Chronicle (written before his death around 1305) has Goffar as "Gofforre" (or Goffre, Goffor, or Goffore), king of "Payters" (Poitiers). It says that Brutus arrived in Aquitaine, which they called "Paytewe" (Poitou) at the time. It gives the name of Subardus as "Suard" (or "Sward"), and Imbertus as Ymbert, who is Goffar's men's "chieftain by common agreement".

John Hardyng's Chronicle (1437) has Goffar as "Goffore" as king of "Aquitayne that Guyen now is" (Guyenne), who fights with Brutus and Corineus hand to hand before retreating to "Gaule ... that now is Fraunce".

Robert Fabyan's Chronicle (written before his death in 1511/1512) includes Goffar as "a Prynce named Copharius" of the province of "Gallia now called Guyan" (Guyenne).

John Rastell's The Pastyme of People (1529) mentions Goffar (under the name "Copharius") as a prince of "Gallia now callyd Guian" (Guyenne), as part of a very condensed version of the Brutus story.

Locrine (1595), a play attributed to Shakespeare, mentions "Goffarius, the arm strong King of Gauls, / And all the borders of great Aquitaine". It gives Goffarius a brother, Gathelus, who had been fought by Corineus.

Richard White of Basingstoke's Comitis Palatini Historiarum Libri (1597) has Goffar as "Gopharius Rex Picthus". He explains that "Pict"/"Pictus" refers to the Pictones of Poitou (not the Picts of Scotland), and harmonises the distance between Aquitaine and the mouth of the river Loire (which he has as being in "Celtic Gaul"), by saying that Brutus travelled to Aquitaine after anchoring there.

French tradition 
Alain Bouchart drew on Monmouth's Historia Regum Britanniae for the early part of his 1514 history of Brittany Les Grandes Croniques de Bretaigne. This included Goffar as "Grofarius", the "poictevin" king of Aquitaine, with Brutus arriving where Saint-Nazaire is now and follows the Historias story closely.

Jean Bouchet's Les Annales d'Aquitaine (1524) includes Goffar as "Groffarius Pictus", the king of Aquitaine, with his duke "Ymbert". It follows the story of Monmouth's Historia Regum Britanniae, which the author cites as the source for Goffar, along with La Mer des Histoires and an anonymously written Chronicle from the library of Saint Denis.

La Décoration du Pays et Duché de Touraine (1541) by Thibault Lepleigney also includes Goffar as "Grofarius Pictus". It cites Jean Bouchet's Les Annales d'Aquitaine (1524).

Name 
In Horn et Rimenhild, a twelfth century French version of the story of King Horn, one of the King of Dublin's two sons is called Guffer. William Henry Schofield gives Goffarius Pictus as a potential source of this name.

In the fourteenth century play Generides, the Sultan of Persia is named "Goffore". Frederick James Furnivall's 1865 edition of the play also mistakenly gives "Goffare" as the name of the Sultan's niece.

References 

Mythological kings
Legendary French people